The Abbāsi House is a large historic house museum in Kashan, Iran. It was built during the late 18th century and belonged to a wealthy glass merchant. It is partly converted into a teahouse, a traditional restaurant, and a small shop. Other such houses, including the Borujerdi House and the Tabātabāei House, are located nearby.

Structure
The Abbassian House consists of several courtyards and multistorey buildings, and is decorated with plaster reliefs, mirror-work, and stained glass. One of the chambers has a ceiling designed with mirror pieces so as to give the impression of a starry sky under the nocturnal glitter of candlelight. Secret passageways were also built into the house.

Gallery

References

External links

Historic house museums in Iran
Buildings and structures in Kashan
Tourist attractions in Kashan
Houses completed in the 18th century